Romeo Bandison (born 12 February 1971) is a former American football defensive tackle in the National Football League for the Washington Redskins.  He played his Senior year of high school football at Tamalpais (Mill Valley, CA), college football at the University of Oregon and also played a season in his homeland for the Amsterdam Admirals of the (then) WLAF.

References

1971 births
Living people
American football defensive tackles
Washington Redskins players
Amsterdam Admirals players
Oregon Ducks football players
Dutch players of American football
Sportspeople from The Hague
Boise State Broncos football coaches
Colorado Buffaloes football coaches
New Mexico State Aggies football coaches
Tamalpais High School alumni